The 1927 St. Xavier Musketeers football team was an American football team that represented St. Xavier College (later renamed Xavier University) in the Ohio Athletic Conference (OAC) during the 1927 college football season. In its eighth season under head coach Joseph A. Meyer, the team compiled an 8–1–1 record (1–0 against OAC opponents) and outscored opponents by a total of 411 to 63. The team played its home games at Corcoran Field in Cincinnati.

Schedule

References

St. Xavier
Xavier Musketeers football seasons
St. Xavier Musketeers football